The Frank and Jess Story is the first collaboration album by rappers Kurupt and Roscoe. It was released on November 11, 2008 by Koch Records.

Singles
The album produced one single, "Break It Down Like", which was released September 2, 2008.

Critical reception

Track listing

References

Kurupt albums
Roscoe (rapper) albums
E1 Music albums
2008 albums
Collaborative albums